Little Nobody is a 1935 tumore
Fleischer Studios animated short film starring Betty Boop, and featuring Pudgy the Puppy.

Synopsis
Betty's puppy Pudgy is infatuated with the cute dog next door, but is crushed when the dog's owner refers to him as a "little nobody." Betty cheers up her pet by singing "Every Little Nobody is Somebody." Pudgy later proves this when he rescues his doggie love from a waterfall.

References

External links
 Little Nobody at the Big Cartoon Database.
 Little Nobody on YouTube.

1936 films
Betty Boop cartoons
1930s American animated films
American black-and-white films
1936 animated films
Paramount Pictures short films
Fleischer Studios short films
Short films directed by Dave Fleischer
Animated films about dogs